The 2016–17 Alba Fehérvár is the 68th season of the Alba Fehérvár in the highest tier professional basketball league, NB I/A in Hungary.

Team

}

Depth chart

Transfers summer 2016

Tryouts

In

Players
 Ákos Keller from Szolnoki Olaj KK, Hungarian National Championship
 Bradford Burgess from Falco KC Szombathely, Hungarian National Championship
 Iván Keller from Kecskeméti TE, Hungarian National Championship
 Joel Nshimba from Vasas-Akadémia, Hungarian National Championship
 James Farr from Xavier Musketeers, NCAA
 Justin Edwards from Kansas State Wildcats, NCAA
 Brandon Taylor from Utah Utes, NCAA Division I
 Winston Shepard from Golden State Warriors, NBA (Summer League)
 Alhaji Mohammed from BC Mures, Romanian Basketball League

Coaches

Out

Players
 Balázs Simon retired (sports director)
 Kenny Chery to Real Betis Energía Plus, Liga ACB
 Milán Csorvási to Egis Körmend, Hungarian National Championship
 József Czirbus to Jászberényi KSE, Hungarian National Championship
 Anthony Myles to Soproni KC, Hungarian National Championship
 Ryan Pearson to Le Mans Sarthe Basket, LNB Pro A
 Tristan Spurlock to Asociacion Quimsa Santiago del Estero, Liga Nacional de Básquet
 Jerrel Wright to Zalakerámia-ZTE KK, Hungarian National Championship
 Zoltán Supola to PVSK Panthers, Hungarian National Championship
 Bence Fülöp to Kecskeméti TE, Hungarian National Championship
 Bradford Burgess (injured)

Championship
The 2016–17 Nemzeti Bajnokság I/A is the 86th season of the Nemzeti Bajnokság I/A, the highest tier professional basketball league in Hungary.

Regular season

Mid-Season

Playoffs
Teams in bold won the playoff series. Numbers to the left of each team indicate the team's original playoff seeding. Numbers to the right indicate the score of each playoff game.

FIBA Europe Cup
The 2016–17 FIBA Europe Cup was the 2nd season of the FIBA Europe Cup, a European basketball club competition organised by FIBA Europe. The season began on 18 October 2016, with the regular season, and concluded on April 25, 2017, with the second leg of the Finals.

Regular season

Second round

Hungarian Cup

Quarterfinals

Semifinals

Final

Statistics

Championship

FIBA Europe Cup

Hungarian Cup

2016–17 in Hungarian basketball